James Christopher Belich  (born 1956) is a New Zealand historian, known for his work on the New Zealand Wars and on New Zealand history more generally. One of his major works on the 19th-century clash between Māori and Pākehā, the revisionist study The New Zealand Wars (1986), was also published in an American edition and adapted into a television series and DVD.

Since 2013 Belich has been the Beit Professor of Imperial and Commonwealth History and the Director of the Oxford Centre for Global History at the University of Oxford.

Background
Of Croatian descent, he was born in Wellington in 1956, the son of Sir Jim Belich, who later became Mayor of Wellington. He attended Onslow College.

He gained an M.A. in history at Victoria University before being awarded a Rhodes Scholarship in 1978 and travelling to Oxford to complete his D.Phil at Nuffield College.

Academic career
He lectured at Victoria University of Wellington for several years before moving to the University of Auckland. In 2007 he was appointed Professor of History at the Stout Research Centre for New Zealand Studies at Victoria University.

The New Zealand Wars (1986) was based on his DPhil thesis, and won the international Trevor Reese Memorial Prize. It was later turned into a major documentary series for Television New Zealand.  It was controversial for the startling claim that northern Maori invented trench warfare.

I Shall Not Die': Titokowaru's War (1990), based on his MA thesis, was also highly praised, winning the Adam Award for New Zealand literature.

Belich has written a two-volume work A History of the New Zealanders, consisting of Making Peoples (1996) and Paradise Reforged (2001).

In the 2006 Queen's Birthday Honours, Belich was appointed an Officer of the New Zealand Order of Merit, for service to historic research.

He expanded his area of research to colonial societies in general and the place of settler colonialism in world history with Replenishing the earth (2009). The book was the choice of Maya Jasanoff in a list of the 11 best scholarly books of the 2010s by The Chronicle of Higher Education.

In 2011 Belich was appointed Beit Professor of Commonwealth History at Oxford University.

Awards and honours

2011 Prime Minister's Awards for Literary Achievement

Works
 Titokowaru's War and Its Place in New Zealand's History. MA Thesis. Victoria University of Wellington, 1979.
 New Zealand Wars 1845–1870: An Analysis of Their History and Interpretation. 1982. PhD Thesis. Nuffield College/Oxford University
 I Shall Not Die: Tītokowaru’s war, New Zealand, 1868-9. Bridget Williams Books, 1993. 
 Making Peoples: A History of the New Zealanders from Polynesian Settlement to the End of the Nineteenth Century. Penguin, 2007. 
 The New Zealand Wars and the Victorian Interpretation of Racial Conflict. Auckland University Press, 1986.  
 Paradise Reforged: A History of the New Zealanders from the 1880s to the Year 2000. University of Hawai’i Press, 2001. 
 Replenishing the Earth: The Settler revolution and the rise of the Anglo-world, 1783–1939. Oxford University Press, 2009. 
 The Prospect of Global History. co-edited with John Darwin, Margret Frenz and Chris Wickham. Oxford University Press, 2016. ISBN 9780198732259
 The World the Plague Made: The Black Death and the Rise of Europe. Princeton University Press, 2022. ISBN 9780691215662

See also
 New Zealand literature
 New Zealand Wars
 New Zealand history

References

External links

 Victoria University of Wellington Stout Research Centre page 
 University of Auckland website 
 University of Auckland personal page 
 Profile on the New Zealand Book Council website
 Staff page at Oxford University

1956 births
Living people
New Zealand Rhodes Scholars
20th-century New Zealand historians
New Zealand people of Croatian descent
Officers of the New Zealand Order of Merit
Academic staff of the University of Auckland
Victoria University of Wellington alumni
Alumni of Nuffield College, Oxford
People educated at Onslow College
Beit Professors of Commonwealth History
Academic staff of the Victoria University of Wellington
21st-century New Zealand historians